Fatima Maada Bio (née Jabbe; born 27 November 1980), known simply as Fatima Bio, is a Sierra Leonean former actress,  screenwriter and film producer who is the current First Lady of Sierra Leone, as the wife of President Julius Maada Bio. As an actress, Bio participated in various Nollywood movie projects, as well as other acting projects in the United Kingdom. She hails from Sierra Leone's Kono District, in the southeastern part of the country; however, part of her heritage is Gambian.

Early life and education

Fatima Jabbe was born in Koidu, Kono District, to Tigidankay and Umar Jabbie on 27 November 1980. Her mother is Sierra Leonean and her father is Gambian. She was raised in a Muslim family and remains a devout Muslim herself. She grew up in Kono and attended primary school at the Ansarul Islamic School. She later went to St Joseph's "Convent" Secondary School in Freetown.

She holds a Bachelor of Arts with Honours degree in Performing Art from the Roehampton Institute in London. She also earned a Bachelor of Arts degree in journalism at the University of the Arts, London College of Communication, in 2017.

Career

Prior to her marriage to Maada Bio, Fatima had a successful career in the entertainment industry under her maiden name Fatime Jabbe. She began working in the African film industry when she was in London. She wrote, acted, and produced Nollywood films including Battered, Shameful Deceit, Mr. Ibu in Sierra Leone, Expedition Africa, and The Soul. She starred in the film Mirror Boy and won a "Best Supporting Actress" at the 2011 ZAFAA Awards.

In 2013, she won The Pan-African "Woman of the Year Award" from All African Media. And In 2013, she earned a Best Female Actress at the African Oscars in Washington, DC. The same year, she won the Gathering of African Best (GAB) Awards for promoting a positive view of Africans around the world.

Charity
Bio is a patron of a number of charities in the UK, including the John Utaka Foundation, which helps African children and young people cope with health challenges.

Marriage and family

Before Fatima married Bio in 2013, she had previously been married to a footballer with whom she had two children (Mohamed and Tida). She and Bio were married in a private ceremony in London on 25 October 2013. On 27 June 2014, she gave birth to a son, Hamza Maada Bio who died three days later. On 7 September 2015, a year after losing their son, she gave birth to their daughter, Amina.

References

External links
 

Living people
First Ladies of Sierra Leone
People from Koidu
Sierra Leonean people of Gambian descent
Sierra Leonean Muslims
Sierra Leonean Mandingo people
1980 births